Castlemilk is a district of Glasgow, Scotland.  It lies to the far south of the city centre, adjacent to the Croftfoot and Simshill residential areas within the city  to the north-west, the town of Rutherglen - neighbourhoods of Spittal to the north-east and Fernhill to the east, Linn Park and its golf course to the west, and the separate village of Carmunnock further south across countryside.

The area was developed by the Glasgow Corporation as a peripheral housing scheme in the 1950s to accommodate 34,000 people from inner-city slum areas such as the Gorbals. The new residents were provided with open spaces, a clean environment and indoor toilets and bathrooms. The modern development grew around Castlemilk House, a stately old mansion built around Cassilton Tower, which was started in 1460 on the site of a 13th-century castle, and was demolished in 1972.

The population had dropped from 37,000 in 1971 to roughly half that number in 1991. However, despite the social problems associated with poverty and unemployment, the area has seen the benefits of a regeneration strategy implemented in the 1980s which has focused on improved housing and the development of local arts. Community groups and Cooperative housing associations have done a lot to regenerate the housing and improve the amenities for local people. A swimming pool, sports centre, shopping arcade and community centres have been developed.

History

Early history
According to "The Incomplete History Of Castlemilk", by the Castlemilk History Group, Carmunnock did not escape the religious turbulence of the years following Mary Queen of Scots' flight to and later imprisonment in England. While Carmunnock church remained with the Established Church, several of its ministers fought for the National Covenant. The Rev James Mowbrae was dismissed in 1639; his successor Rev Matthew McKail was transferred to Bothwell in 1649, while Rev Andrew Morton was also dismissed for non-conformity in 1662. Rev Morton was to return in 1687 upon the decline of the rule of bishops. According to Mrs Herbert (Author of the History of Carmunnock), 'The villagers, joyfully taking the opportunity, forcibly threw the unpopular Rev Mr Boyd out of the manse'.

Over this period the Stuarts added to their estate. Again confusion surrounds the date in history of the Stuart connection with Cassiltoun. According to some sources, the Stuarts sold their Dumfriesshire estate of Castlemilk to Lord Maxwell in 1579, and from that date the Lanarkshire property of Cassiltoun became known as Castlemilk. Other sources give the date of this development as 1759. Certainly in writing up his Statistical Account of the parish in 1796 the Rev Adam Forman seemed comfortable in his use of the term Castlemilk for the former estate of Cassiltoun.

This period saw further additions to the Stuart fortunes through their links with the parish of Torrance and the estate of Milton. Torrance House (in present-day Calderglen Park, East Kilbride) was built in 1605 and sold to the Stuarts of Castlemilk in 1650. It remained with the Stuarts until 1947, when it was acquired by the East Kilbride Development Corporation as their Headquarters. During the 18th Century, the valuable estate of Milton on the north side of Glasgow came by marriage into the possession of the family. It included a large area north of Cowcaddens and Parliamentary Road, Hyndland, Barmulloch and Balornock, besides the site of the present large housing scheme of Milton. In 1706 a deed of entail was obtained, obliging every future holder of the Milton estate to assume the name of Crawfurd.

This fact, coupled with inter-marriage with the Stirlings of Keir and the failure of the Stuart male line in 1797 explains the present family name of Crawfurd Stirling Stuart. This complex family history was explored by Andrew Stuart of Torrance and Castlemilk who published The History of the Genealogy of the Stewarts in 1798.

In 1991, in advance of the redevelopment of the site of Castlemilk House into an adventure playground, an archaeological dig was carried out by Archaeology Projects Glasgow in close collaboration with the now defunct Castlemilk Local History Group.
Two trial trenches to the west of the tower discovered a defensive ditch which had been filled with midden material such as pottery, bone, bottle glass and a clay pipe bowl that would date the deposit to the 18th century if not earlier.
The remains of a stone structure which could have been a possible bridge was also uncovered running across the line of the ditch. Other trial trenches produced very little of interest.

Development of modern estate
 
Castlemilk and the other peripheral housing schemes in Glasgow had their origins in the city's housing crisis after the end of the Second World War. Many inner city areas such as Hutchesontown contained street after street of sub-standard tenement housing, and the city as a whole had a shortage of affordable good quality accommodation. The Castlemilk estate had already been acquired for building by the Glasgow Corporation under a compulsory purchase order in 1936, prior to the war.

 
In 1947, a delegation from Glasgow visited Marseille to see the new social housing designed by the Swiss-French architect Le Corbusier, who was a pioneer of modern urban planning. The group examined how his ideas could be applied to Glasgow with the proposed development of new “townships” on the outskirts of the city. Around the same time a second strategy was also formulated for the dispersal of the city's population, this being new towns such as East Kilbride (which is only a few miles across countryside from Castlemilk). However, the city fathers were anxious to ensure that most people remained living within the Glasgow boundaries so they keenly pursued the townships project even with limited space available on which to build. The other areas identified for this were Pollok, Drumchapel and Easterhouse – collectively referred to along with Castlemilk as "the big four".

In December 1952, Glasgow Corporation approved a sketch layout plan for the construction of a new township at Castlemilk with an estimated cost of £16,000,000. It was planned to ultimately comprise some 8,300 houses. In early 1953, more detailed plans for the development of Castlemilk were prepared by Archibald George Jury, who had been appointed as Glasgow’s first City Architect in 1951, a post he held until his retirement in 1972.

There was a very limited range of different house types planned for the initial Castlemilk scheme. Most of the accommodation was to be contained in three or four-storey tenement blocks. There were also to be three-storey terraced houses intended for larger families and a few other house types designed for the elderly and other groups such as the local fire service personnel. The original 1950s flats, entered from common closes, seem to have been designed as modern versions of the traditional Glasgow tenements. Unlike many of the Victorian tenement dwellings, however, these flats came with interior bathrooms and running hot and cold water. Many of the street names (Ardencraig, Ardmaleish, Birgidale, Dougrie, Dunagoil, Machrie) were derived from rural locations in the County of Bute.

The multi-storey blocks in Castlemilk did not arrive until the 1960s. Built after the added amenities that included: a swimming pool, the shopping arcade and the community centre. Archibald Jury was the architect responsible for the creation of the three 20-storey tower blocks in Dougrie Road, from the planning stage in 1960 to their completion in 1966 (these are still standing). The Mitchelhill high-rise blocks at Ardencraig Road, built on high and exposed ground at the edge of the Cathkin Braes and designed to be a prominent feature of the city skyline, were designed and built by George Wimpey Ltd, between 1963 and 1965 (they were demolished in 2005); Wimpey was also responsible for the construction of Bogany Flats in 1966 (demolished as early as 1993).

Public housing policy in Scotland was radically changed by the Tenants' Rights, Etc. (Scotland) Act 1980, which gave tenants the right to buy their council houses for the first time. Since then, renovation, demolition and refurbishment of Castlemilk’s existing housing stock has taken place, as well as the development of areas of new build houses for owner-occupation. Tenure has diversified with home ownership transferred from the City Council to local Housing Associations and owner-occupiers.

The township centre at Castlemilk Arcade / Dougrie Drive was developed by Ravenseft Properties Ltd between 1961 and 1963 on a  site which was formerly the location of the large country houses at Castleton, west of Castlemilk House itself. The centre was designed to contain about sixty shops at an estimated cost of £3m to £4m. The shops are still standing, with an 80% occupancy rate. The north side of the arcade on Dougrie Drive contains Castlemilk's only pub, the Oasis. After the shopping centre's small Co-op Food supermarket confirmed it would closed its doors in 2016, residents launched a campaign for improved grocery shopping provision in the district, with local bodies failing to attract any suitable tenants for either the Braes Centre (described by campaigners as badly outdated) or at any new standalone sites.

The original neighbourhood shops were built at the ground floors of the tenement blocks, following the old Glasgow pattern. Ownership of these small shops has been transferred from the Council to the Glasgow Housing Association, who have let the surviving blocks of shops in Stravanan Road and Tormusk Road to various tenants.

Castlemilk House was demolished in 1972 after being used as a children's home for several years and then falling derelict. The accompanying stables block (built 1794, designed by David Hamilton and Category B listed) survived and was restored; it now contains the local housing offices, community facilities and a nursery. The green areas between the clusters of housing, including the old features of the Castlemilk House estate, are managed as a Park and Woodlands, an award-winning project aimed to benefit the community.

Unlike some amenities, schools were in the Castlemilk plans from its conception. Eight primary schools served the area, with some of them closing and merging going into the 21st century – there are now four: Miller, Castleton, St Bartholomew's RC and John Paul II RC, plus one special school, Kirkriggs.

Glenwood Secondary School was the first of the scheme's three high schools to be constructed in 1958, followed by the (Catholic) St Margaret Mary's Secondary School in 1962 and Grange Secondary School in 1968. Falling population numbers led to Glenwood closing its doors in 1990 (a business centre now occupies the site) and the pupils transferring to Grange, which was renamed Castlemilk High School. In 2001 that school was rebuilt on a smaller scale on the same site, with the playground and buildings swapping places; St Margaret Mary's was reconstructed in 2002 using the same method. Some children living in the north-west of Castlemilk attend King's Park Secondary School in the neighbouring Simshill district, whilst the village school in Carmunnock is affiliated to Castlemilk High.

In 2001, the Reverend John D. Miller, minister of Castlemilk East Parish Church (from 1971 until his retirement in 2007), was elected Moderator of the General Assembly of the Church of Scotland. Miller Primary School in Castlemilk was named after him and his wife. As part of the regeneration of Castlemilk in 1999, several public artworks were commissioned and placed at prominent entrances into the area; these included works by sculptors Kenny Hunter and Rick Kirby.

Notable residents, past and present

Ikechi Anya, footballer
Darren Brady, footballer
Garry Brady, footballer
Steve Bronski (Steven Forrest), musician (Bronski Beat)
Jimmy Calderwood, football player and coach 
Gerry Cinnamon, singer-songwriter
Sadie Docherty, politician, Lord Provost of Glasgow, 2012–2017
Willie Donachie, footballer
 Prof Brian Duffy, businessman, and former board member of Celtic F.C.
Islam Feruz, footballer
Derek Forbes, bassist with Simple Minds
Arthur Graham, footballer
Jimmy Graham, footballer
Tommy Graham, footballer
James Grant (musician), musician, singer and songwriter and member of Love and Money 
Eddie Gray, footballer
Frank Gray, footballer

Hugh Hendry, investment manager
Ray Houghton, footballer
Stephen House, Police Scotland Chief Constable
Rory Hughes, rugby player
Dave King, businessman (Rangers F.C. owner)
Gary Lamont, actor
Frank Maguire, lawyer
Libby McArthur, Singer and actor.
James McCarthy, footballer
Paul McCole, actor
Stephen McCole, actor
Bobby McCulley, footballer
Aiden McGeady, footballer
Jim McInally, footballer
David McKay, actor
Andy McLaren, footballer
Charlie Miller, footballer
Alex O'Hara, footballer
William Ruane, actor
Rita Rusk, hair stylist
Bernie Slaven, footballer
Ricky Sbragia, football player and coach

See also
 Glasgow tower blocks

References

External links

Castlemilk, Origins and History Maps and Photographs
Castlemilk at Gazetteer for Scotland 
Neighbourhood Profile and statistics at Understanding Glasgow (2012)
Castlemilk History MySpace 
CANMORE page showing historical photographs of Castlemilk House
Castlemilk History Facebook This is the most up-to-date information for Castlemilk History...
Video footage of the Stables, Bridge and Glen
 Overspill Policy and the Glasgow Slum Clearance Project in the Twentieth Century: From One Nightmare to Another? article by Lauren Paice, Oxford Brookes University, 2008

Areas of Glasgow
Housing estates in Glasgow